Brisbane is a ghost town in what was then Morton County but today is Grant County in the U.S. state of North Dakota. A 1910 application for a new post office at Brisbane from the National Archives and Records Administration in Washington, D.C. locates Brisbane in section 9 of Township 133 north, Range 86 west. (To understand what the terms "township" and "range", please see the article Township.) An article in the Leith, North Dakota, Index newspaper dated March 1, 1913 states that Brisbane had been established 2 years earlier and that a general store, a hardware and grocery store, a grain elevator, a blacksmith shop and a restaurant were located there. The article also indicates that 3 schools were located in the same township.
In the spring of 1906 there were only a few people living in Brisbane vicinity. The first settlers were men, but in that year women arrived there. The attention of the first settlers was entirely given to stock raising, and no farming was done. Now all is changed and hundreds of acres of rich and fertile soil are annually producing under intelligent and careful farming, thousands of bushels of wheat oats and flax. The village of Brisbane started two years ago, and it is a hustling little town. The business interests are represented by a splendid general store owned and run by E.H. Robinson, a hardware and grocery store run by Sorum and Kindschi, and elevator managed by Martin Jacobs. There is also a blacksmith shop, a cement block building and a restaurant building. There are three school houses in the township and all the pupils within easy reach of the schools. There are four steam breaking outfits and threshing rigs in this township and they all have plenty of work for the coming spring. This part of the country is advancing fast and every one is doing well. Quite a little dairying is being carried on in the Brisbane vicinity. (Leith Index March 1, 1913)

Geography of Grant County, North Dakota
Ghost towns in North Dakota
Populated places established in 1906
1906 establishments in North Dakota